Marceli Konrad Strzykalski (born 19 February 1931) is a Polish former footballer who competed in the 1960 Summer Olympics.

References

1931 births
Living people
Association football midfielders
Polish footballers
Olympic footballers of Poland
Poland international footballers
Footballers at the 1960 Summer Olympics
Legia Warsaw players
Sportspeople from Ruda Śląska